Roberto Pieraccini  (born 15 November 1955 in Genoa, Italy) is an Italian and US electrical engineer working in the field of speech recognition, natural language understanding, and spoken dialog systems. He is currently Director of Engineering at Google in Zurich, Switzerland, within the Google Assistant organization.  He has been an active contributor to speech research and technology since 1981.

Education
He obtained a degree in electrical engineering from the University of Pisa in 1980 with a thesis on the equalization of data channels.

Career
After his graduation, between 1981 and 1989 he worked at CSELT (Centro Studi e Laboratori Telecomunicazioni), the then Italian telephone company's research center, at Bell Labs (Murray Hill, NJ) between 1990 and 1995, and AT&T Labs (Florham Park, NJ) between 1995 and 1999. In 1999 he was Director of the Natural Dialog group at SpeechWorks International until the company was acquired by Scansoft in 2003, and then held a position of manager for the Advanced Conversational Technologies department at IBM Research (Thomas J. Watson Research Center, Yorktown Heights, NY) from 2003 and 2005.  He served as the Chief Technology Officer at SpeechCycle from 2005 to 2011. Between 2012 and 2013 he was the Director of the International Computer Science Institute.  Between March 2014 and December 2017 he was at Jibo, Inc. as its  Director of Advanced Conversational Technologies. He joined Google Zurich in March 2018, and Google New York in July 2022 as a Director of Engineering for the Natural Language Processing Team in the Google Assistant. 

He was the elected Chair of the IEEE Speech and Language Technical Committee (SLTC) between 2007 and 2008, and on the board of several international conferences and events. He was a member of the editorial boards of the IEEE Signal Processing Magazine and of the International Journal of Speech Technology. He was also the general co-chair of the SIGdial Conference on Dialog and Discourse, held in London in September 2009, and the general technical program chair of Interspeech 2011 held in Florence, Italy, in August 2011. During his career he authored more than 120 articles, book chapters, and conference publications  in the fields of speech recognition, language modeling, optical character recognition, and dialog systems. He was elevated to the grade of Fellow of IEEE in 2010 for contributions to statistical natural language understanding and spoken dialog management and learning. He is also a Fellow of ISCA, the International Speech Communication Association.

Books
He is the author of The Voice in the Machine, published by MIT Press in 2011, a general audience book on the history, technology, and the business of computers that understand speech. In September 2021, still with MIT Press, he published AI Assistants, an accessible account of the recent evolution of virtual digital assistant like Siri, Amazon Alexa, and the Google Assistant.

Honors and awards
He is the recipient of PrimiDieci USA 2016, an award sponsored by the Italian-American Chamber of Commerce and recognizing, every year,  10 prominent Italian-Americans in fields such as science, technology, and art.

On December 10, 2019 he received a Doctor in Science honorary degree  from the Heriot Watt University of Edinburgh.

References

American computer scientists
Living people
Fellow Members of the IEEE
American chief technology officers
1955 births
Italian computer scientists
Speech processing researchers